Niemczyk is a Polish surname. It may refer to:

 Andrzej Niemczyk, Polish volleyball coach
 Barbara Niemczyk (born 1942), Polish volleyball player
 Carolin Niemczyk (born 1990), German singer
 Julian Niemczyk (1920–2009), American diplomat
 Leon Niemczyk (1923–2006), Polish actor
 Małgorzata Niemczyk (born 1969), Polish volleyball player

 Niemczyk, Kuyavian-Pomeranian Voivodeship, a village in north-central Poland

Polish-language surnames